Ishak Pasha (1444 – died 30 January 1487) was an Ottoman general, statesman, and later Grand Vizier of Albanian or Greek origins.

Origin
Turkish orientalist Halil Inalcik (1916–2016) believed that the figure of Ishak Pasha stemmed from the confusion between several Ottoman Ishak Pashas (particularly Ishak bin Abdullah and Ishak bin Ibrahim) and Ishak Bey, but according to him Ishak Pasha was Greek or of Croatian origins. According to German orientalist Franz Babinger (1891–1967) he was a convert of Orthodox Albanian or Greek origin. Jean-Claude Faveyrial reveals that Ishak Pasha was Albanian.

Career
In circa 1451, Ishak Pasha was appointed as the beylerbey (provincial governor) of Anatolia; the same year, the newly ascended Sultan Mehmed II ("the Conqueror") forced him to marry his father Sultan Murad II's widow Sultan Hatun.

His first term as a Grand Vizier was during the reign of Mehmed II. During this term, he transferred Oghuz Turk people from their Anatolian city of Aksaray to newly conquered Constantinople in order to populate the city, which had lost a portion of its former population prior to the 1453 conquest. The quarter of the city where the migrants were settled is now called Aksaray.

His second term was during the reign of Sultan Bayezid II. He died on 30 January 1487 in Thessaloniki.

In popular culture

 Alev Elmas played Ishak Pasha in the 1951 film, İstanbul'un Fethi.
 Ishak Pasha is mentioned together with Mehmed II in the song The Fall Of Constantinople by the neofolk band H.E.R.R.
 Ishak Pasha is referenced in the 2011 video game Assassin's Creed: Revelations, as the former Mentor of the Assassin Brotherhood in the Ottoman Empire, in which his armor was hidden underneath the Hagia Sophia, and is later recovered by the protagonist Ezio Auditore da Firenze by collecting his Memoir Pages scattered around Constantinople. Assassin's Creed Rebellion, a free-to-play mobile game, further details his story during the Spanish Inquisition as he and his apprentice Yusuf Tazim search for Niccolo Polo's journal in 1495 (which contradicts historical records of Ishak Pasha's death in 1487).
 Yılmaz Babatürk portrayed Ishak Pasha in the 2012 film, Fetih 1453.

See also
 Ishak Pasha Palace
 List of Ottoman Grand Viziers

References

Further reading
 Danişmend, İsmail Hâmi (1961), Osmanlı Devlet Erkânı, İstanbul:Türkiye Yayınevi. 
 Tektaş, Nazım (2002), Sadrazamlar-Osmanlı'da İkinci Adam Saltanatı, İstanbul:Çatı Kitapları.

Governors of the Ottoman Empire
Converts to Islam
15th-century Grand Viziers of the Ottoman Empire
Devshirme
1497 deaths
Grand Viziers of Mehmed the Conqueror
Year of birth unknown
Ottoman generals
Albanian Grand Viziers of the Ottoman Empire
Albanians from the Ottoman Empire